The 1923–24 season was Manchester City F.C.'s thirty-third season of league football, and tenth consecutive season in the Football League First Division, excluding the four years during the First World War in which no competitive football was played.

The season was notable for several reasons: primarily, it was the first season Manchester City would spend at their iconic Maine Road stadium, the predecessor Hyde Road having been left in the quest to meet the club's ambitions and move into a ground with a higher capacity. The season would also prove to be manager Ernest Mangnall's last at the club. He was at the time the club's longest serving manager, managing the club for 12 years and served 350 competitive games. He rounded his time at the club off with an FA Cup semi-final appearance, the first time that the club had got this far in the competition since they won it twenty years previously.

Team Kit

Football League First Division

Results summary

Reports

FA Cup

Squad statistics

Squad
Appearances for competitive matches only

Scorers

See also
Manchester City F.C. seasons

References

External links
Extensive Manchester City statistics site

Manchester City F.C. seasons
Manchester City F.C.